"Player's Anthem" is the first single released from the Junior M.A.F.I.A.'s debut album Conspiracy. Produced by Clark Kent, the song contains a sample of The New Birth's song "You Are What I'm All About". Featuring a chorus by the Notorious B.I.G., "Player's Anthem" became a big hit for the group, peaking at 13 on the Billboard Hot 100 and was certified gold by the RIAA on September 7, 1995 for sales of over 500,000 copies. The remix sounds similar to the original, but samples "Memory Lane" by Minnie Riperton.

The song also contains a sample of Doug E. Fresh's "La Di Da Di" featuring Slick Rick. A French musician, Jérémie Mondon (a.k.a. Demon) contains a sample from this song for the track called, "Streets" for his album, "Midnight Funk". Junior M.A.F.I.A. and The Notorious B.I.G. first performed the song live at the 1995 Source Awards on August 3. They also performed the song live in an episode of The Grind on MTV in 1995, in an episode of Showtime at the Apollo which aired on November 18, 1995, and at Stadion Feijenoord in Rotterdam, Netherlands on July 6, 1996.

Single track listing

A-Side
"Player's Anthem" (Dirty Version)- 5:24
"Player's Anthem" (Radio Version)- 4:10
"Player's Anthem" (Instrumental)- 4:10

B-Side
"Player's Anthem" (Dirty Remix)- 4:10
"Player's Anthem" (Radio Remix)- 4:17
"Player's Anthem" (Remix Instrumental)- 4:10

Charts

Weekly charts

Year-end chart

Certifications

References

1995 debut singles
Junior M.A.F.I.A. songs
The Notorious B.I.G. songs
Dirty rap songs